The Republicans group may refer to:

 The Republicans group (National Assembly), the French National Assembly parliamentary group
 The Republicans group (Senate), the French Senate parliamentary group